Mühlebach is a quarter in the district 8 of Zürich.

It was part of Riesbach municipality that was incorporated into Zürich in 1893.

Gallery

References 

District 8 of Zürich